Calder Gardens is a forthcoming sanctuary in the United States dedicated to the work of artist Alexander Calder.

Plans for Calder Gardens were designed by the firm of Herzog and de Meuron. Funding for the $70 million project was provided by the City of Philadelphia, the Commonwealth of Pennsylvania, and private donors.

It is scheduled to open in 2024.

See also
 List of single-artist museums

References 

Sculpture gardens, trails and parks in the United States
Parks in Philadelphia
Art museums and galleries in Philadelphia